Christopher "Chris" Effield Brown (born 30 January 1960) is a former field hockey player from New Zealand, who was a member of the national men's team that finished seventh at the 1984 Summer Olympics in Los Angeles, California. He was born in Auckland.

External links
 

New Zealand male field hockey players
Olympic field hockey players of New Zealand
Field hockey players at the 1984 Summer Olympics
Field hockey players from Auckland
1960 births
Living people
20th-century New Zealand people
21st-century New Zealand people